Sironj is a town and a municipality in Vidisha district in the Indian state of Madhya Pradesh.

Demographics 
 India census, Sironj had a population of 52,100. Males constitute 53% of the population and females 47%. Sironj has an average literacy rate of 67%, higher than the national average of 59.5%: male literacy is 62%, and female literacy is 47%. In Sironj, 17% of the population is under 6 years of age.

References 

Cities and towns in Vidisha district